A Scout County (also Scout Area) is an administrative division within The Scout Association of the United Kingdom. There are currently 115 Counties and Areas in the United Kingdom. These bodies are responsible for providing programmes and support for their member Scout Districts.

The term County is used by England and Northern Ireland, while Area is used in Wales and Region in Scotland. For the purposes of this article, the term County is used where County, Area or Region can be applied.

Organisation

Counties are led by a County Commissioner (who is appointed by the Chief Scout), who is supported by a team of Assistant County Commissioners and an Executive Committee.

Counties are themselves divided into Districts. The average County will have around 10 Districts, and around 3,900 members (of which 3,150 are under 18).

Counties are responsible for the provision of the Scout Network, as well as supporting all Scouting activities within their member Districts.

Scout Counties in England
There are currently 58 counties in England. They are:
 Avon
 Bedfordshire
 Berkshire
 Birmingham
 Buckinghamshire
 Cambridgeshire
 Central Yorkshire
 Cheshire
 Cleveland
 Cornwall
 Coventry
 Cumbria
 Derbyshire
 Devon
 Dorset
 Durham
 East Lancashire 
 East Sussex
 Essex
 Gloucestershire
 Hampshire
 Hereford and Worcester
 Hertfordshire
 Humberside
 Isle of Wight
 Kent
 Leicestershire
 Lincolnshire
 Greater London Middlesex West
 Greater London North
 Greater London North East
 Greater London South
 Greater London South East
 Greater London South West
 Greater Manchester East
 Greater Manchester North
 Greater Manchester West
 Merseyside
 Norfolk
 Northamptonshire
 Northumberland
 North Yorkshire
 Nottinghamshire
 Oxfordshire
 Shropshire
 Solihull
 Somerset
 South Yorkshire
 Staffordshire
 Suffolk
 Surrey
 Warwickshire
 West Lancashire 
 West Mercia
 West Sussex
 West Yorkshire
 Wiltshire

Scout Counties in Northern Ireland
Antrim
Armagh
Belfast
Down
Fermanagh
Londonderry
Tyrone

Scout Regions in Scotland
Highlands and Islands
North East
East
South East
Forth
Clyde
West
South West

Scout Areas in Wales
Brecknock
Cardiff and Vale
Carmarthenshire
Ceredigion	
Clwyd
Glamorgan
Gwent
Mid Glamorgan
Montgomeryshire
Snowdonia and Anglesey
Pembrokeshire
Radnor

Scout Areas outside of the United Kingdom 
 British Scouting Overseas

See also

Local councils of the Boy Scouts of America

References

External links
 UK Scout Association homepage
 UK Scout Association (Scoutbase)

The Scout Association